Packages from Daddy is a 2016 Taiwanese drama film written, produced and directed by Tsai Yin-chuan. The film stars  Fann Wong, Lee Lee-zen, Sieh Fei and Yu Jo-ching, and co-stars Kaiser Chuang and Ding Ning. It was released in theaters on November 18, 2016.

Premise
Lan, a nine-year-old boy, lives happily with his parents and sister in a peaceful seaside town; until Lan comes home one day to find his father dead, sending his life into disarray as the family grieves. Not long after, Lan receives a package containing an odd-shaped clock sent by his father before his death. Lan tries to fix the clock which no longer moves, but in vain. Eventually he discovers that the clock is in fact a marine chronometer with a backstory...

Cast
 Fann Wong as Mom (Fang Hui-ying) 	  	 
 Lee Lee-zen as Dad (Yeh Wen-li)
 Sieh Fei as Yeh Lan  	
 Yu Jo-ching as Sister (Yeh Cheng)
 Kaiser Chuang as Mr. Chou	 
 Ding Ning as Aunt
 Fu Lei as Grandpa Wang
 Tang Chih-ping as Son of Grandpa Wang
 Helena Hsu as Hui-ying's sister
 Huang Tsai-yi as Sister in church
 Wu Pong-fong as Angler
 Hsiao Yeh as himself

Soundtrack

Featured songs

References

External links

2016 films
Taiwanese drama films
Films about widowhood
2016 drama films
Films about children
Films about grieving
2010s Mandarin-language films